Till We Meet Again is a 1922 American silent melodrama film directed by Christy Cabanne and starring Julia Swayne Gordon, Mae Marsh, and J. Barney Sherry. It was released on October 15, 1922.

Cast list

Preservation
With no prints of Till We Meet Again located in any film archives, it is a lost film.

References

External links

Films directed by Christy Cabanne
American silent feature films
American black-and-white films
1920s English-language films
Melodrama films
1922 drama films
1922 films
Associated Exhibitors films
1920s American films
Silent American drama films